Wangechi Mutu (born 1972) is a Kenyan-born American visual artist, known primarily for her painting, sculpture, film, and performance work. Born in Kenya, she has lived and established her career in New York City for more than twenty years. Mutu's work has directed the female body as subject through collage painting, immersive installation, and live and video performance while exploring questions of self-image, gender constructs, cultural trauma, and environmental destruction and notions of beauty and power.

Background and education
Mutu was born in 1972 in Nairobi, Kenya. She was educated at Loreto Convent Msongari (1978–1989), and later studied at the United World College of the Atlantic, Wales (I.B., 1991). Mutu moved to New York in the 1990s, focusing on Fine Arts and Anthropology at The New School for Social Research, and Parsons School of Art and Design. She earned a BFA degree from Cooper Union for the Advancement of the Arts and Science in 1996 and a master's degree in sculpture from Yale School of Art in 2000.

Art 

Mutu's work crosses a variety of mediums, including collage, video, performance, and sculpture, and investigates themes of gender, race, and colonialism. Her work, in part, centers on the violence and misrepresentation experienced by Black women in contemporary society. A recurring theme of Mutu's work is her various depictions of femininity. Mutu uses the feminine subject in her art, even when the figures are more or less unrecognizable, whether by using the form itself or the texture and patterns the figure is made from. Her use of otherworldly depictions for women, many times shown in a seemingly sexual or sensual pose, brings about discussion of the objectification of women. Specifically, Mutu addresses the hyper-objectification of black female bodies and has used an otherworldly nature to reiterate the fictitious nature of society's depictions of black women. Whether through delicate lined patterns or familiar feminine builds, Mutu's various ways of representing feminine qualities is said to enhance the strength of the images or the significance of the issues presented. Many of Mutu's artworks are known to be interpreted in contradictory ways, both seen as complicit to problematic society and as hopeful for future change in society. It's also been said that Mutu's use of such intentionally repulsive or otherworldly imagery may help women to step away from perfection as it is presented in society and instead embrace their own imperfections and become more accepting of the flaws of others as well.

In an interview with the Museum of Contemporary Art Australia curator, Rachel Kent, she states, "I try to stretch my own ideas about appropriate ways to depict women. Criticism, curiosity, and voyeurism lead me along, as I look at things I find hard to view – things that are sometimes distasteful or unethical". Mutu frequently uses "grotesque" textures in her artwork and has cited her mother's medical books on tropical diseases as an inspiration, stating that there is "nothing more insanely visually interesting and repulsive than a body infected with tropical disease; these are diseases that grow and fester and become larger than the being that they have infected, almost."

Mutu is able to enact personal and cultural transfigurations by transitioning from painting to sculpture and back again. Mutu says " This transition was so powerful because I used my mind as an object maker  – I think I always painted like a sculptor." In Mutu's collage work she began to respond to western advertisement and beauty standards:  "I began an ongoing critique and an intellectual an actual vandalization of those images, which were violating me by rendering me invisible."

Works

Exhuming Gluttony: A Lover's Requiem (2006) 
Mutu has exhibited sculptural installations. In 2006, Mutu and British architect David Adjaye collaborated on a project. They transformed the Upper East Side Salon 94 townhouse in New York into a subterranean dinner-party setting entitled Exhuming Gluttony: A Lover's Requiem. Furs and bullet holes adorned the walls while wine bottles dangled in a careless chandelier-like form above the stained table. The table's multiple legs resembled thick femurs with visibly delicate tibias, and the whole space had a pungent aroma. The artists strove to show a moment of gluttony as she stated, "I wanted to create a feast, a communing of minds and viewers Something has gone wrong, there is a tragedy or unfolding of evil". This vicious hunger was seen as a connection between images of The Last Supper, the climate of the current art-buying world, and the war in Iraq.

Suspended Playtime (2008) 
Another installation of Mutu, Suspended Playtime (2008) is a series of bundles of garbage bags, wrapped in gold twine as if suspended in spiders' webs, all suspended from the ceiling over the viewer. The installation makes reference to the common use of garbage bags as improvised balls and other playthings by African children.

Sketchbook Drawing (2011–12) 
As a visual artist, Mutu takes inspiration from fashion and travel magazines, pornography, ethnography, and mechanics. In 2013, at the Nasher Museum of Art, Mutu showed her sketchbook drawings for the first time ever in her retrospective exhibition, Wangechi Mutu: A Fantastic Journey. The books consisted of strangely attractive, yet grotesque human figures fused with animals, plants, or machines.

The End of Eating Everything (2013) 
In 2013, Wangechi Mutu's first-ever animated video, The End of Eating Everything, was created in collaboration with recording artist Santigold, commissioned by the Nasher Museum of Art. The video was animated by Awesome + Modest.

Nguva na Nyoka (2014) 
In 2014, Mutu's art was on display at an exhibition entitled Nguva na Nyoka, at Victoria Miro Gallery in London. At the exhibition's opening night, Mutu displayed a performance piece, wherein guests were encouraged to consume custom-made Wangechi Mutu chocolate mermaids. The guests could obtain a mermaid only by "snapping a photo of their first bite, lick, taste", operating as a commentary on "the public consumption of brown bodies".

The Seated series (2019) 
In 2019, Mutu created bronze statues (titled The Seated I, The Seated II, The Seated IV) for the exterior niches of the Metropolitan Museum of Art. The statues seated women were displayed from September 9, 2019 through January 12, 2020.

MamaRay (2020) 
In 2020 Mutu completed her large bronze sculpture, MamaRay, commissioned by the Nasher Museum of Art at Duke University.

Exhibitions
Mutu's work has been exhibited at galleries and museums worldwide including the San Francisco Museum of Modern Art, The Contemporary Austin (Texas), the Miami Art Museum, Tate Modern in London, Centre for Fine Arts in Brussels, the Studio Museum in Harlem in New York, Museum Kunstpalast in Düsseldorf, Germany, the Centre Georges Pompidou in Paris, and the Nasher Museum of Art at Duke University. Her first solo exhibition at a major North American museum opened at the Art Gallery of Ontario in March 2010.

She has held one-person shows at the Museum of Contemporary Art Australia; Deutsche Guggenheim, Berlin; the Brooklyn Museum of Art; Montreal Museum of Contemporary Art; San Francisco Museum of Modern Art; Staatlichen Kunsthalle Baden-Baden, Germany; Wiels Contemporary Art Center, Brussels; the Nasher Museum of Art at Duke University, North Carolina; the Block Museum of Art at Northwestern University, Illinois; and Miami Art Museum.

On 21 March 2013, she held her first United States solo exhibition, Wangechi Mutu: A Fantastic Journey at Nasher Museum of Art. The exhibition Wangechi Mutu: A Fantastic Journey subsequently traveled to the Brooklyn Museum's Elizabeth A. Sackler Center for Feminist Art in October 2013.

She participated in the 2008 Prospect 1 Biennial in New Orleans and the 2004 Gwangju Biennale in South Korea. Her work has been featured in major exhibitions including Greater New York at the P.S.1 Contemporary Art Center and the Museum of Modern Art in New York, Black President: The Art and Legacy of Fela Anikulapo-Kuti at the New Museum of Contemporary Art in New York and the Barbican Centre in London, and USA Today at the Royal Academy in London.

In Fall 2013, the creative team of Wangechi Mutu took part in the main project of the 5th Moscow Biennale of Contemporary Art.

In 2014, she participated in The Divine Comedy. Heaven, hell, purgatory from the perspective of African contemporary artists at the Museum of Modern Art (MMK), Frankfurt / Main, curated by Simon Njami. Mutu was awarded the 2014 United States Artist Grant.

In 2014 Mutu founded the charitable organization Africa's Out! located in Brooklyn New York. The organization is devoted to supporting artists whose work subverts traditional narratives around Africa and its diaspora.

In 2015, Mutu participated in the 56th Venice Biennale's International Art Exhibition entitled All The World's Futures, curated by Okwui Enwezor at the Giardini and the Arsenale venues. She also participated in the Dak'Art Biennial, the Kochi-Muziris Biennial, the Paris Triennial: Intense Proximity, the International Center of Photography's Triennial, and the Moscow Biennale.

In 2016, her film The End of Carrying All was exhibited at the Museum of Fine Arts, Houston, Texas. The film depicts Mutu crossing a landscape with a basket filling up with consumer goods as the landscape changes, ending with a volcanic eruption. In 2016, she also participated in several group exhibits, including "Blackness in Abstraction," at the Pace Gallery in New York, "Black Pulp!" at the International Print Center in New York, and "Africans in America" at the Goodman Gallery in Johannesburg.

In 2017, her black bronze sculpture Water Woman, of which depicted a nguva, was placed at the foot of the amphitheater at the Contemporary Austins fourteen-acre sculpture park at Laguna Gloria. Based on the East African folklore of the half woman and half sea creature is a representation of histories narrative of women as cunning temptresses. The exhibition ran from September 23, 2017, to January 14, 2018, when it became a part of the museum's permanent collection.

In September 2019, four female bronze sculptures by Mutu, "Seated I, II, III, and IV", were placed to occupy the empty niches always intended to house free-standing sculpture in the facade of the Metropolitan Museum of Art in the first instillation and exhibition ("The New Ones Will Free Us" September 9 – Fall 2020) of what will be an annual commission meant to feature work by contemporary artists. Mutu has described the bronze statues as having been inspired by caryatids. Initially, the sculptures were planned to be displayed until January 12, 2020, but their exhibition was extended to June 8, 2020, and further extended to Fall 2020 due to the COVID-19 pandemic. "Seated I" and "Seated III" were subsequently acquired for The Met's permanent collection. A discussion with her about the exhibit and contemporary times was recorded on July 28, 2020 for a series entitled Women and the Critical Eye.

In January 2020, Mutu was part of Artpace's exhibit entitled Visibilities: Intrepid Women of Artpace. Curated by Erin K. Murphy, Visibilities not only kicks off Artpace's 25th anniversary celebration, but also highlights past artists from their International Artist-in-Residency program, such as Mutu who was a resident there in Fall of 2004. Mutu's 12-panel series Histology of the Different Classes of Uterine Tumors, made up of collaged digital prints, was exhibited in the Hudson Showroom.

In 2021 Mutu had a solo exhibition at the Storm King Art Center, New Windsor, New York, USA. According to the Art Center, Mutu's outdoor works assert "the existence and cultural relevance of ancient original myths, fables, and histories."

In 2023 the New Museum featured a retrospective of Mutu's work. The solo exhibition entitled Mutu: Intertwined, features roughly 115 pieces ranging from early in her career to brand new pieces showcasing various mediums and techniques including sculpture, video, collage, and more.

Influence of Afrofuturism and Africanfuturism
Mutu's work has been called "firmly Africanfuturist and Afrofuturist", as exemplified in her piece, The End of Eating Everything (2013). In her 2013–2014 installation at the Brooklyn Museum, the curatorial placard accompanying her work A'gave described Afrofuturism as "an aesthetic that uses the imaginative strategies of science fiction to envision alternate realities for Africa and people of African descent". For critics, Mutu's imagined alternate realities for Africa through the medium of science fiction definitively situated Mutu in the genre of Afrofuturism.

Specific elements of Mutu's art that situate her within this genre include her amalgamations of humans and machines, or Cyborgs, within collages such as Family Tree as well as the film The End of Eating Everything. Additionally, Mutu's work consistently involves intentional re-imaginations of the African experience. In Misguided Little Unforgivable Hierarchies, she examines social hierarchy and power relationships through the medium of collage, for "rankings of peoples have historically been constructed around fabricated racial and ethnic categories".  In Family Tree, as in many of her works, Mutu deliberately constructs both a past and a future within the single figure through displaying diagrams from antique medical journals as well as mechanical images.

Collections 
Her work is included in the collections of the Museum of Modern Art, New York; The Whitney Museum of American Art; The Studio Museum in Harlem; Museum of Contemporary Art, Chicago; the Museum of Contemporary Art, Los Angeles; the Nasher Museum of Art at Duke University;  the Brooklyn Museum; Tate Modern in London.

Publications 

 Wangechi Mutu: I Am Speaking, Are You Listening?
 Wangechi Mutu: A Fantastic Journey (2013), Schoonmaker, Nasher Museum of Art at Duke University.

Awards 
On 23 February 2010, Wangechi Mutu was honoured by Deutsche Bank as its first "Artist of the Year". The prize included a solo exhibition at the Deutsche Guggenheim in Berlin. Entitled My Dirty Little Heaven, the show traveled in June 2010 to the Wiels Center for Contemporary Art in Forest, Belgium.

In 2013, Mutu was awarded the BlackStar Film Festival Audience Award for Favorite Experimental Film in Philadelphia, Pennsylvania for her film The End of Eating Everything, as well as the Brooklyn Museum Artist of the Year, Brooklyn, New York.

Philanthropy 
In 2014, Mutu founded the charitable organization Africa's Out! to "advance radical change through the power of art and activism, particularly supporting artists, initiatives and institutions from Africa and its Diaspora that celebrate freedom of creative expression."

References

Further reading
Wangechi Mutu, as told to Faye Hirsch. "The Women". Art in America, November 2013. New York: Brant Publications, Inc. pp. 54–55.
"Grotesque Sensations: Carnivalising the Sensorium in the Art of Wangeshi Mutu" by Bettina Papenburg in: B. Papenburg and M. Zarzycka (eds.) Carnal Aesthetics. London: I.B.Tauris, 2013. .
Preziuso, Marika. “Is America Really Full? A Conversation with Wangechi Mutu.” Transition, no. 129, 2020, pp. 26–45.  Accessed 1 Apr. 2021.

External links
Official website 

1972 births
Living people
Afrofuturists
Collage artists
Kenyan women artists
Artists from New York City
American women painters
People educated at Atlantic College
People educated at a United World College
Yale School of Art alumni
American women printmakers
Cooper Union alumni
21st-century American women artists